The Journal of Evolutionary Biology is a peer-reviewed scientific journal published monthly covering the field of evolutionary biology. It is owned by the European Society for Evolutionary Biology. The founding editor-in-chief was Stephen C. Stearns. He was succeeded by Pierre-Henri Gouyon (1992–1995), Rolf Hoekstra (1996–1999), Peter van Tienderen (2000–2003), Juha Merilä (2004–2007), Allen Moore (2007–2010), Michael G. Ritchie (2011-2017), and Wolf U. Blanckenhorn (2017-2021). The current editor is Max Reuter (University College London).

References

External links 
 

Delayed open access journals
Wiley-Blackwell academic journals
Evolutionary biology journals
Bimonthly journals
English-language journals
Publications established in 1988